Barry McIntyre (born 9 August 1937) is a former Australian rules footballer who played for the St Kilda Football Club in the Victorian Football League (VFL).

Notes

External links 

Living people
1937 births
Australian rules footballers from Victoria (Australia)
St Kilda Football Club players